Owen Anchorage is an anchorage located between Woodman Point and Fremantle, in Western Australia.

It has also been known as "Owen's Anchorage".

Before the completion of the Fremantle Harbour inner harbour on the Swan River, it was considered as an integral part of the harbour facilities. 
It is closer to the coastline than Success Bank and Parmelia Bank, and lies to the north of Cockburn Sound, and south of Gage Roads.

References

Fremantle Harbour